The 11th South American Junior Championships in Athletics were held in Maracaibo, Venezuela, between October 13–17, 1976.

Participation (unofficial)
Detailed result lists can be found on the "World Junior Athletics History" website.  An unofficial count yields the number of about 152 athletes from about 6 countries:  Brazil (46), Chile (22), Colombia (21), Peru (17), Uruguay (1), Venezuela (45).

Medal summary
Medal winners are published for men and women
Complete results can be found on the "World Junior Athletics History" website.

Men

Women

Medal table (unofficial)

References

External links
World Junior Athletics History

South American U20 Championships in Athletics
1976 in Venezuelan sport
South American U20 Championships
International athletics competitions hosted by Venezuela
Ath
1976 in youth sport
October 1976 sports events in South America